Pancheria is a genus of shrubs and trees in the family Cunoniaceae. It is to endemic to New Caledonia and contains 27 species. Leaves or whorled (or opposite in Pancheria confusa), simple or pinnate. The flowers are arranged in capitula, fruits are follicular. The species are dioecious. The genus is well diversified on ultramafic rocks and some species are nickel hyperaccumulators. It is related to Cunonia and Weinmannia. It was named after Jean Armand Isidore Pancher.

List of species 

(all endemic to New Caledonia)

 Pancheria ajiearoana 
 Pancheria alaternoides 
 Pancheria beauverdiana 
 Pancheria billardieri 
 Pancheria brunhesii 
 Pancheria calophylla 
 Pancheria communis 
 Pancheria confusa 
 Pancheria dognyensis 
 Pancheria elegans 
 Pancheria engleriana 
 Pancheria ferruginea 
 Pancheria gatopensis 
 Pancheria × heterophylla 
 Pancheria hirsuta 
 Pancheria humboldtiana 
 Pancheria × lanceolata 
 Pancheria mcphersonii 
 Pancheria minima 
 Pancheria multijuga 
 Pancheria ouaiemensis 
 Pancheria phillyreoides 
 Pancheria reticulata 
 Pancheria robusta  
 Pancheria rubrivenia 
 Pancheria ternata 
 Pancheria xaragurensis

References

 
Oxalidales genera
Flora of New Caledonia
Endemic flora of New Caledonia
Taxonomy articles created by Polbot
Dioecious plants
Taxa named by Adolphe-Théodore Brongniart
Taxa named by Jean Antoine Arthur Gris